Bernauer Straße is a Berlin U-Bahn station located on the .

History
Built by the subway architect A. Grenander in 1930 this station was a station of the GN Bahn (Gesundbrunnen-Neukölln) of line D. On 8 February 1944, it was destroyed due to ceiling openings.

In April 1945 it was closed due to World War II, and reopened again in May 1945.

After the Second World War, the subway station was below the border between the Soviet and French sectors. As a result, the building of the Wall on 13 August 1961 closed the station, making it, like five other stations along the line, a "Geisterbahnhof (Ghost Station)" where trains passed through. An opening came only with the political turnaround, at which on 12 April 1990, initially the western part was made accessible again. The entrance gate was removed on 19 March 1990 on the decision to open the station. The bullet-riddled holes in the U-Bahn station were later removed. The eastern exit had to be renovated and was reopened on 1 July 1990.

Notes 

U8 (Berlin U-Bahn) stations
Buildings and structures in Mitte
Railway stations in Germany opened in 1930